Atyoida serrata is a species of freshwater shrimp of the family Atyidae and genus Atyoida. The species lives in the Vungu, Umgeni, and Mtamvuna rivers in South Africa, as well as the Langevin River on Réunion Island.

References

Crustaceans described in 1888
Atyidae
Taxa named by Charles Spence Bate
Fauna of South Africa
Arthropods of Réunion